Rud Farq (also Romanized as Rūd Farq and Rūd-e Farq; also known as Rood Fargh) is a village in Garmsar Rural District, Jebalbarez-e Jonubi District, Anbarabad County, Kerman Province, Iran. At the 2006 census, its population was 573, in 102 families.

References 

Populated places in Anbarabad County